J. Adrian Jackson is a Rear Admiral in the U.S. Navy.  He is the Deputy Director for the U.S. Central Command.

He has served as Commander of the Naval Reserve Readiness Command South, and as Vice Commander, Maritime Defense Zone, U.S. Atlantic Fleet.

Education
 Bachelor's degree from Florida State University in 1970.

References

External links
Official Profile

Year of birth missing (living people)
Living people
Florida State University alumni
Recipients of the Legion of Merit